The Mayflower Mall is a single level shopping mall in Sydney, Nova Scotia, Canada. It is the only regional mall in the Cape Breton Regional Municipality of Nova Scotia, and the community's main destination for fashion shopping. The mall features a diverse anchor mix including Best Buy, Winners, Sport Chek, Michaels, Staples, and Hudson's Bay.

The mall opened in 1980 with Hudson's Bay, Dominion, and Woolco as original anchor stores. Shortly after opening in February 1983, Hudson's Bay was converted to Simpsons, another department store chain owned by the Hudsons Bay Company (HBC). In the 1982 HBC annual report, it outlines the reason for conversion is Simpsons had better market recognition joining the two other locations in Halifax and Dartmouth. Simpsons was converted back to Hudson's Bay along with the stores in Halifax and Dartmouth by August 1986. During the 1990s, a stand-alone Sobeys store was opened and Woolco was converted to Walmart in 1994 when Walmart bought 122 Woolco stores from Woolworth Canada. In the mid 2000s, Sobeys closed and Walmart moved across the street to a new big box power centre development also owned by the mall. Around this time Mayflower Mall had been renovated with a new food court and the former Sobeys and Walmart spaces being redeveloped into several new retailers.

See also
 List of largest enclosed shopping malls in Canada
 List of shopping malls in Canada

References

External links
 

Shopping malls in Nova Scotia
Shopping malls established in 1980
Buildings and structures in the Cape Breton Regional Municipality
Tourist attractions in Cape Breton County